Below is a chronological list of awards won by Cuban-American singer Gloria Estefan. Estefan won three Grammy Awards and was nominated for 15 since she began her career in 1984. In 1994, she won her first Grammy Award, the Grammy Award for Best Traditional Tropical Latin Album, for the 1993 studio album, Mi Tierra. Later, she would win her first Latin Grammy Award for her music video for the single "No Me Dejes De Querer". She was also awarded with the Latin Grammy Award Recording Association's Person of the Year award. Estefan was the first singer to have a Diamond album in Spain, for sales of more than a million copies.

ASCAP Pop Music Awards 

!Ref.
|-
| 1992
| "Coming Out of the Dark"
| Most Performed Song
| 
|

BMI Awards

BMI Latin Awards

!Ref.
|-
| 1999
| "Corazón Prohibido"
| rowspan=3|Award-Winning Song
| 
|
|-
| 2000
| "Oye!"
| 
|
|-
| rowspan=2|2001
| "No Me Dejes de Querer"
| 
|rowspan=2|
|-
| Herself
| Publisher of the Year
|

BMI Pop Awards

!Ref.
|-
| 1992
| "Coming Out of the Dark"
| rowspan=2|Award-Winning Songs
| 
|
|-
| 2003
| "Whenever, Wherever"
| 
|

Billboard Awards

Billboard Music Awards

!Ref.
|-
| rowspan=3|1993
| rowspan=2|Herself
| Top Female Artist
| 
| rowspan=3|
|-
| Top Billboard 200 Artist - Female
| 
|-
| "I See Your Smile"
| Top Hot Adult Contemporary Track
| 
|-
| rowspan=3|1994
| rowspan=2|Herself
| Top Latin Album Artist
| 
| rowspan=3|
|-
| Top Tropical/Salsa Latin Artist 
| 
|-
| rowspan=2|Mi Tierra
| rowspan=2|Top Tropical/Salsa Latin Album 
| 
|-
| rowspan=2|1995
| 
| rowspan=2|
|-
| rowspan=2|Herself
| rowspan=2|Top Tropical/Salsa Latin Artist 
| 
|-
| rowspan=3|1997
| 
| rowspan=3|
|-
| Abriendo Puertas
| Top Tropical/Salsa Latin Album
| 
|-
| No Pretendo
| Top Latin Song
|

Billboard Music Video Awards

!Ref.
|-
| 1995
| "Everlasting Love"
| Dance Clip of the Year
| 
|
|-
| 2001
| "No Me Dejes de Querer"
| Latin Clip of the Year
| 
|

Latin Billboard Music Awards

!Ref.
|-
| rowspan=3|1994
| Herself
| Tropical/Salsa Artist of the Year 
| 
| rowspan=3|
|-
| Mi Tierra
| Tropical/Salsa Album of the Year 
| 
|-
| "Mi Tierra"
| Tropical/Salsa Song of the Year 
| 
|-
| rowspan=4|1996
| Herself
| Spirit of Hope
| 
| rowspan=4|
|-
| Abriendo Puertas
| Tropical/Salsa Album of the Year, Female
| 
|-
| rowspan=2|"Abriendo Puertas"
| Tropical/Salsa Video of the Year
| 
|-
| Latin Dance Single of the Year 
| 
|-
| rowspan=2|1999
| rowspan=2|"Oye!"
| Latin Dance Club Play of the Year 
| 
| rowspan=2|
|-
| rowspan=3|Latin Dance Maxi-Single of the Year 
| 
|-
| rowspan=1|2000
| "Santo Santo" (with Só Pra Contrariar) 
| 
| 
|-
| rowspan=3|2001
| rowspan=2|"No Me Dejes de Querer"
| 
| rowspan=3|
|-
| Latin Dance Club Play Track of the Year
| 
|-
| Alma Caribeña
| Tropical/Salsa Album of the Year, Female 
| 
|-
| rowspan=2|2002
| rowspan=2|"Out of Nowhere"
| Latin Dance Club Play Track of the Year
| 
| rowspan=2|
|-
| Latin Dance Maxi-Single of the Year 
| 
|-
| 2004
| "Hoy"
| Latin Pop Airplay Track of the Year, Female 
| 
|
|-
| 2005
| "Tu Fotografía"
| Tropical Airplay Track Of The Year, Female 
| 
| 
|-
| rowspan=2|2008
| 90 Millas
| Tropical Album of the Year, Female 
| 
| rowspan=2|
|-
| "No Llores"
| rowspan=2|Tropical Airplay Song of the Year, Female 
| 
|-
| 2009
| "Píntame De Colores"
| 
|
|-
| 2011
| Herself
| Spirit of Hope
| 
|

Grammy Awards

Latin Grammy Awards
The Latin Grammy Awards are awarded annually in the United States since September 2000 for outstanding contributions to Spanish language music. Estefan has won five awards from seven nominations.

International Dance Music Awards 

!Ref.
|-
| 2013
| "Hotel Nacional"
| Best Latin Dance Track
| 
|

NARM Awards 

!Ref.
|-
| 1994
| Mi Tierra
| Best Selling Latin Recording
| 
|

Pollstar Concert Industry Awards 

!Ref.
|-
| 1992
| Into The Light World Tour
| Most Creative Stage Production 
| 
|

Premios Ondas 

!Ref.
|-
| rowspan=2|1993
| "Mi Tierra"
| Best Song
| 
|rowspan=2|
|-
| rowspan=3|Herself
| rowspan=2|Best Latin Artist
| 
|-
| 1995
| 
|
|-
| 2013
| Music Award
| 
|

1980s

1986
1st prize at the Annual Tokyo Music Fair, "Conga".
Billboard Music Awards
 Top Adult Contemporary Single, "Words Get in the Way"
 Top New Pop Artist (Combined LP's & Singles)
 Top Pop Singles Artist (Duo/Group)

1988
"Female Vocalist of the Year" by Performance Magazine

1989
American Music Awards
Favorite Pop/Rock Band/Duo/Group
American Billboard Award
Songwriter of the Year

1990s

1990
MTV Video Music Awards
International Viewer's Choice Awards—MTV Internacional, "Oye mi Canto (Hear my Voice)"

1991
BMI Songwriter of the Year

1992
Premio Lo Nuestro a la Musica Latina
Excellence Award

1993
Ellis Island Medal of Honor
Hispanic Heritage Award
Star on the Hollywood Walk of Fame

1994
World Music Awards
Best-Selling Latin Performer
Musicares Person of the Year

1997
American Music Award
Best Female Latin Artist
BMI Prestigious President's Award
Induction to the Songwriter's Hall of Fame

1998
Amigo Music Awards (Spain)
Best Latin Female Artist

1999
ALMA Award
Outstanding Music Video, "Heaven's What I Feel"
Outstanding Host in a Variety/Music/Comedy Special or Series, "The World Music Awards"
Ricardo Montalbán Lifetime Achievement Award
The 100 Greatest Women in Rock and Roll
Gloria Estefan ranked at #81

2000s

2000
American Music Awards
Award of Merit
Blockbuster Award
Favorite Song from a Movie, "Music of My Heart"
Harry Chapin Memorial Humanitarian Award
Amigo Music Awards (Spain)
Best Latin Singer
International Women's Forum "Hall of Fame" Award

2003
The Buoniconti Fund Humanitarian Award

2004
Magic 106 Exceptional Woman of the Year Award

2008
Dial Radio Award (Spain)
St. Jude Hospital for Children Humanitarian Award

2009
BMI Icon of the Year

2010s

2010
Las Vegas "Walk Of Stars" Award (Given to Emilio & Gloria Estefan)

2017
Kennedy Center Honors

2019
Library of Congress Gershwin Prize (Given to Emilio & Gloria Estefan)
Billboard Greatest of All Time
Gloria Estefan ranked #125 at Billboard Greatest Artists of All Time
Gloria Estefan ranked #17 at Billboard Greatest Of All Time Top Dance Club Artists
Gloria Estefan ranked #13 at Billboard Greatest Of All Time Hot Latin Songs Artists

References

External links
GloriaHeaven.com.

Estefan, Gloria
Estefan, Gloria